Coral Glades High School is a public high school in Coral Springs, Florida, United States. Founded in 2004, it is part of the Broward School District. It educates students in grades 9 through 12.

Academics

The school's core academics include math, social studies, science, and English.

Advanced Placement classes are offered each year including the AP Capstone Program.

Extracurricular activities
There are extracurricular clubs and activities at the school, including a cameraman crew, a variety of sports, a marching band, a concert band, a drum line, a color guard, a chamber orchestra, a full orchestra, a debate team, a chorus, arts, culinary operations, a step team, cheer leading, foreign language clubs, a TV Production club, flag football, a multicultural society, Mu Alpha Theta, DECA, Key Club, National Honor Society (NHS) and JROTC.

Acting
This class has multiple shows every year and competes in drama competitions, they've won over 100 awards. They're currently under the wing of Sag-Aftra Actress Diana Focas.

Music program
The Coral Glades High School Music Association is a program consisting of band, orchestra, and color guard.

WJAG Television
Coral Glades High is home to a television station dubbed "WJAG".

The Prowl
The school newspaper, The Prowl, is published once a month and has been recognized by The Sun-Sentinel and Florida Scholastic Press Association.

Choral program
Coral Glades has a choral program with a variety of groups such as ensemble, show choir, quartet, men's ensemble, mixed and woman's chorus.

Engineering program 
Coral Glades has an engineering program in which students design objects using 3D printers and applications such as Solidworks and Mastercam. Now as of 2019 students can learn AutoCad.

Demographics
As of the 2021–22 school year, the total student enrollment was 2,817. The ethnic makeup of the school was 54.5% White, 38.1% Black, 35.4% Hispanic, 3.1% Asian, 0.6% Pacific Islander, 3.4% multiracial, and 0.6% Native American or Native Alaskan.

References

External links

Official website
WJAG Recap Youtube page

Educational institutions established in 2004
Broward County Public Schools
High schools in Broward County, Florida
Public high schools in Florida
Buildings and structures in Coral Springs, Florida
2004 establishments in Florida